Vanessa Caswill is an English director and writer of short films and television dramas.

Caswill directed BBC miniseries Thirteen (2016) and Little Women (2017). Little Women marked the first time in Angela Lansbury's career of nearly 80 years that she was directed by a woman. “It was a very intimate relationship with a director which I had never really encountered before... She was quite wonderful in her ability to come to us actors — not in a loud way, from a distance she would come and whisper in our ears. And in that way, she was able to impart very subtle things that otherwise perhaps as a woman she might not have wanted to, for everybody to hear. But for the actor to hear it was delightful and I loved working that way with her.”

She will direct The Statistical Probability of Love at First Sight.

Filmography

References

External links 
Official website

Interview at Constellation Mag

English television directors
English television writers
British women television writers
Living people
Year of birth missing (living people)
British women television directors